Linstead is a town in the parish of St. Catherine, Jamaica in the West Indies.  In 1991 its population was 14,144. It is located 12 mi/19 km NNW of Spanish Town.

Description
Close to Ewarton and Windalco Ewarton works, a large aluminum plant employing many of the local population. Often employing a job share scheme as work in the area is scarce.
It holds a Grand Market celebration each Christmas Eve when people come out and fill the streets, small shops sell toys and other Christmas gifts, and events and parties are held in the square.
It was popularized in the song Linstead Market.

Schools  
Charlemont High School
Linstead Primary and Junior High School
Dinthill Technical High
Rosemount Primary and Junior High
 Redwood primary school 

Victoria All Age
Trinity Preparatory
Saint Dominic Preparatory School
Bread of Life Christian Academy
Mickleton Preparatory
Victoria Primary
Wakefield Primary
McGrath High School

Notable natives
Joseph Hill - singer (Culture)
Clive Hunt - musician and reggae producer
Hedley Jones - musician
Leslie Laing - Olympic gold medalist in 4x400 m relay.
Keith Anthony Morrison - artist, educator, critic, curator and administrator
Asafa Powell - athlete
Arthur Wint - Olympic gold medalist in the 400

References

Populated places in Saint Catherine Parish